Priscilla Kay Alden (born October 24, 1946) is an American television writer and the former head writer for the soap opera, The Young and the Restless.

Career
Alden began writing for The Young and the Restless as a script writer in 1974 while researching her dissertation at the University of Wisconsin-Madison. She was promoted to associate head writer in 1987, then to co-head writer in 1997. 

She took over as head writer the following year when series co-creator William J. Bell stepped down from the position. With Alden as head writer, the show lost about two million viewers (most of the loss occurred in 2004 when Alden co-wrote the show with longtime Y&R scribe and producer John F. Smith), but all soap operas during that period experienced a similar scale of massive audience erosion.

She quit The Young and the Restless in late 2006, and was then hired by Brian Frons, president of ABC Daytime, to consult on its serials All My Children, General Hospital and One Life to Live. She left ABC Daytime after declining All My Children'''s head writer position in Spring 2007, and was hired by Bradley Bell in May 2007 to be an associate head writer for another CBS Daytime drama, The Bold and the Beautiful. On July 18, 2008, it was announced that Alden would be appointed co-head writer of The Bold and the Beautiful in the coming weeks. 

During the WGA strike she went under financial core status  while working for The Bold and the Beautiful.

In 2012, Alden was spotted on the set of The Young and the Restless for the taping of the show's 10,000th episode, leading many to believe she'd re-joined the show as a writer or story consultant.  However, this never came to pass.

On September 21, 2016, Daytime Confidential reported that after ten years since being with the show, Alden had been hired to be story consultant at Y&R, under Sally Sussman's tenure as Head writer. On July 31, 2017, Daytime Confidential announced that both Alden and Sussman will be departing from the show, with Mal Young being named as the new head writer.

There is a scholarship in Alden's name from Emporia State University, in Emporia, Kansas.

Personal life
She has three children and lives with her husband in Illinois.

Positions heldThe Young and the RestlessScriptwriter: May 13, 1974–80
Breakdown writer: 1980–87
Script editor: 1983–85, 1986–87
Associate head writer: 1987–97
Co-head writer: 1997–July 3, 1998; February 16 – December 22, 2006
Head writer: July 6, 1998 – February 15, 2006
Story Consultant: December 6, 2016 – October 27, 2017All My ChildrenStory Consultant December 2006 – April 2007One Life to LiveStory Consultant: December 2006 – April 2007General HospitalStory Consultant December 2006 – April 2007The Bold and the BeautifulCo-head writer (2008–13)
Associate Head Writer (August 6, 2007 – January 21, 2008; April 16, 2008 – 2008)
Interim Head Writer (February 5, 2008 – April 15, 2008)

Head Writing Tenure

Awards and nominations
Daytime Emmy Award 
Nominations, 2008, 2009, Best Writing The Bold and the BeautifulNominations, 1976, 1979, 1986, 1987, 1990–1995, 1997–2001, 2003–2007, Best Writing, The Young and the RestlessWins, 1997, 2000, 2006, Best Writing, The Young and the Restless; 2010, Best Writing, The Bold and the BeautifulWriters Guild of America Award
Wins, 2002 & 2005, Best Writing, The Young and the RestlessNominations, 1999, 2001, 2006, Best Writing, The Young and the Restless''

References

External links
 
MIT Comparative Media Studies
SunTimes
 

American soap opera writers
American women screenwriters
Daytime Emmy Award winners
American women television writers
Living people
Writers Guild of America Award winners
1946 births
People from Hutchinson, Kansas
Women soap opera writers
Screenwriters from Kansas
21st-century American women